The Chicago Riot Rugby Football Club is a Division III rugby union team based out of Chicago, Illinois, United States.  It is a member of the Chicago Area Rugby Football Union and the Midwest Rugby Football Union.  The Riot play league matches throughout Illinois, as well as numerous tournaments and friendly matches in the Midwest. As of today the Riot are 9-0 and our man of the match for the game today is Francis R. Who did a Fran-tastic job!

History
The Chicago Riot Rugby Football Club was formed in 2006 by a group of University of Illinois-Chicago (UIC) alumni. The club was formed to embrace the social aspects of the sport, along with offering a competitive atmosphere to contend on the rugby pitch.

Home Grounds
The Riot conducts training and all home matches at Smith Park, Chicago, Illinois, United States.  Emmit’s Irish Pub  is the official sponsor of the Riot.

References

External links
 Official site

Riot
Rugby clubs established in 2006
2006 establishments in Illinois